The LG V30 is an Android phablet manufactured by LG Electronics as part of the LG V series. Unveiled on 31 August 2017 as the successor to the LG V20, the V30 forgoes the V20's secondary display for a "floating bar" which has nearly the same functions as the second display. It still features quad DACs for improved audio.

History 
The phone was teased on 3 August 2017 in a press release from LG showing the bottom half of the FullVision display. On 7 August press invitations were sent out featuring the words "Lights. Camera. Action." Video teasers were later released, advertising the phone's display, audio and camera capabilities.

Specifications

Hardware 
The V30 has a Gorilla Glass 5 front and rear plate sandwiching an aluminum body and a 6.0-inch P-OLED FullVision Display, with a 2:1 aspect ratio (marketed as 18:9), manufactured by LG Display. Its processor is a Qualcomm Snapdragon 835 SoC with an Adreno 540 GPU, coupled with 4 GB RAM. The V30 has 64 GB of internal storage, while the V30+ has 128 GB, which is expandable via microSD card. This is also the first LG smartphone to feature an OLED display.

The LG V30 uses a dual-lens camera setup with a 16-megapixel main sensor with a 71° field of view, and a 13-megapixel wide angle sensor with a 120° field of view. However, the main camera also features a f/1.6 aperture, the lowest in a smartphone at the time of release, and a 10-bit HDR sensor. The 10-bit HDR image sensor is capable of capturing nearly 1,070,000,000 different colors, which is about 211% more colors than an 8-bit image sensor. The main sensor has optical image stabilization, which corrects motion blur in photos and videos, but there is no OIS on the wide angle lens.

The V30 supports up to 1 Gbps download speed on 4G. The H932 model of the V30, for T-Mobile, is the first smartphone to support 4G's LTE Band 71, with a frequency of 600 MHz.

Software 
The V30 ships with Android 7.1.2 "Nougat" (upgradeable to 9.0 but without Treble support) with LG's custom skin, LG UX 6.0+. It comes with Android's Always on Display feature.

Reception 
The V30 has received praise for having one of the most mature dual-camera systems available and for its audio quality, retaining the headphone jack as other premium smartphones stopped providing it, and including multiple audio sensors for input and a 32-bit Quad-DAC (Digital Analog Converter) for output.

The phone has been criticized for excessive bloatware on carrier-branded devices and its screen quality has been criticized for its relative lack of color saturation and flaws, as with the Google Pixel 2 XL — which features a display also made by LG.

References

Further information 
Android Central — LG V30 gets torn down, shows impressive camera hardware
Android Police — LG V30 enter the JerryRigEverything torture chamber, emerges mostly unscathed
Latest Review - Lg V30 in 2021 

LG Electronics smartphones
LG Electronics mobile phones
Mobile phones introduced in 2017
Android (operating system) devices
Mobile phones with multiple rear cameras
Mobile phones with 4K video recording
Discontinued smartphones